Grenada competes at the 2009 World Championships in Athletics from 15–23 August in Berlin.

Team selection
A team of 6 athletes was
announced to represent the country
in the event.

Medalists
None of the representatives earned a medal at this event.

Results

Men

Women

References

External links
Official competition website

Nations at the 2009 World Championships in Athletics
World Championships in Athletics
Grenada at the World Championships in Athletics